Qez Qabri-ye Doktor Habib (also Romanized as Qez Qabrī-ye Doktor Ḩabīb and Qez Qebrī-ye Doktor Ḩabīb; also known as Kazkabrī, Qez Qabrī, and Qez Qebrī-ye Chahār) is a village in Baladarband Rural District, in the Central District of Kermanshah County, Kermanshah Province, Iran. At the 2006 census, its population was 96, in 22 families.

References 

Populated places in Kermanshah County